Caño Cristales is a Colombian river located in the Serrania de la Macarena province of Meta, and is a tributary of the Guayabero River. It was found in 1969, by a group of cattle farmers. The river is commonly called the "River of Five Colors" or the "Liquid Rainbow," and is noted for its striking colors. The bed of the river from the end of July through November is variously colored yellow, green, blue, black, and especially red, the last caused by Macarenia clavigera plants (family Podostemaceae) on the riverbed.

Geography
The quartzite rocks of the Serrania de la Macarena tableland formed approximately 1.2 billion years ago. They are a western extension of the Guiana Shield of Venezuela.

Caño Cristales is a fast-flowing river with many rapids and waterfalls. Small circular pits known as giant's kettles can be found in many parts of the riverbed, which have been formed by pebbles or chunks of harder rocks.  Once one of these harder rock fragments falls into one of the cavities, it is rotated by the water current and begins to carve at the cavity wall, increasing the dimensions of the pit. Caño Cristales is said to contain no fish.

Fauna and flora

The Serranía de la Macarena is located on the border of three large ecosystems, each of them with high diversity of flora and fauna: the Andes, the Eastern Llanos, and the Amazon rainforest. Plant and animal life are struggling with the lack of nutrients on the solid rock surface of the tableland and have developed diverse adaptations. The representative biome of the Serranía de La Macarena is the hydrophytic rainforest: hot, warm, and cold. The tableland is home to about 420 species of birds, 10 species of amphibians, 43 species of reptiles, and eight primates.

Caño Cristales river has a wide variety of aquatic plants. The water of the river is extremely clear due to the lack of nutrients and small particles. Almost unique is the bright red - pink coloration of riverbed after the rainy period from the end of June till November. This color is caused by great quantities of endemic plant species Macarenia clavígera. This plant is found in some more local rivers, such as the Caño Siete Machos. These red plants adhere tightly to rocks in places where the river has faster current.

References

External links

Rivers of Colombia
National Monuments of Colombia